Testosterone valerate, or testosterone pentanoate, also known as androst-4-en-17β-ol-3-one 17β-valerate, is a synthetic, steroidal androgen and an androgen ester – specifically, the C17β valerate ester of testosterone – which is used in veterinary medicine. It is administered via intramuscular injection and acts as a long-lasting prodrug of testosterone. The medication is available as a component of the veterinary drug Deposterona, which is marketed in Mexico and also contains testosterone acetate and testosterone undecanoate. Testosterone valerate is a short-to-medium duration ester of testosterone, with an elimination half-life of approximately twice that of the short-acting testosterone propionate.

See also
 Testosterone acetate/testosterone undecanoate/testosterone valerate
 Testosterone propionate/testosterone valerate/testosterone undecylenate
 List of androgen esters § Testosterone esters

References

Androgens and anabolic steroids
Androstanes
Ketones
Testosterone esters
Valerate esters
Veterinary drugs